Tess Flore Badocco Helene de Oliveira (born January 6, 1987 in Paris) is a female water polo goalkeeper from Brazil, who won the bronze medal with the Brazil women's national water polo team at the 2003 Pan American Games.

Oliveira also competed at the 2007 Pan American Games, finishing in fourth place. Her twin sister Amanda played in the same team.

See also
 List of women's Olympic water polo tournament goalkeepers

References
  Profile

1987 births
Living people
Water polo players from Paris
People with acquired Brazilian citizenship
Brazilian twins
Twin sportspeople
Water polo players from São Paulo
Brazilian female water polo players
Water polo goalkeepers
Olympic water polo players of Brazil
Water polo players at the 2016 Summer Olympics
Pan American Games bronze medalists for Brazil
Pan American Games medalists in water polo
Water polo players at the 2011 Pan American Games
Water polo players at the 2015 Pan American Games
Medalists at the 2015 Pan American Games
Medalists at the 2011 Pan American Games
21st-century Brazilian women